Valley Township is a township in Rice County, Kansas, in the United States.

Valley Township was established in 1879.

References

Townships in Rice County, Kansas
Townships in Kansas